According to the historical records, firecrackers and fireworks emerged from the Tang Dynasty (618-907 AD) and flourished during the Song Dynasty. Historical records indicate the industry originated in Liuyang City, Hunan Province. In Liuyang City, there are still traces of historical gunpowder research and development at the foot of a mountain at the banks of the Liuyang River preserved for future generations to worship.

Li Tian, a craftsman who lived in the Tang Dynasty in southern Liuyang was credited with the invention of firecrackers. It was said that he mixed charcoal, sulfur and saltpeter, compressed the mixture in an enclosure (a bamboo tube) and the mixture exploded when it was burned. Because of Li Tian's invention, Liuyang became synonymous with fireworks and is commonly known as “the hometown for firecrackers and fireworks. “Liuyang Fireworks” branded products are widely recognized in China.

Although many towns throughout the world have a close association with fireworks there is none with a greater claim to their title 'City of Fireworks' than Liuyang. Situated in the Hunan province of China, Liuyang has a greater concentration of fireworks manufacturers than anywhere else in the world. If you have ever wondered where your fireworks come from, the answer is probably: Liuyang. Nestled in the mountains of Hunan province, fireworks advertising is everywhere throughout the city.

It is the nature of fireworks making that the different processes are spread far apart - a precaution against a chain reaction should there be a single accident. For this reason, you can wander far and wide in and around Liuyang and it appears that everywhere you look there is something happening which involves the creation of fireworks.

"If you stand anywhere in Liuyang at night and look in any direction, there will be fireworks going off. Everywhere. In town, out of town, everywhere you look. In all directions.That also means that everybody else who is buying fireworks will be there, too. People who are buying fireworks from everywhere else in the world. So, at any given breakfast, you'll be sitting down with Brits, Germans, Dutch, Ozzie's, Turks, and Russians-all there for the same reason".

Exactly how long fireworks have been made in Liuyang is the subject of some debate. Since fireworks are generally thought to have originated in China anyway, it is unlikely that there was any definitive point of origin.

It is probable though that the history of fireworks production in Liuyang spans more than 1300 years. "Industries in China", published in 1935, recorded that "the earliest fireworks came into being in the Tang Dynasty (618-907), and Chinese fireworks manufacturing began to flourish during the Song Dynasty; its birthplace is in Liuyang".

During the Yongzheng reign of the Qing Dynasty (1644–1911), Liuyang fireworks became an article of tribute to the royal families which gave an added impetus to the developing trade. Fireworks workshops boomed, until more than nine out of ten households were engaged in the trade. Fireworks began to be exported to more than 20 countries and regions.

History of Hunan
Fireworks
Liuyang